The Lesser Poland Voivodeship Sejmik is the regional legislature of the Voivodeship of Lesser Poland. It is a unicameral parliamentary body consisting of thirty-nine councillors elected to five-year terms. The current chairperson of the assembly is Rafał Bochenek.

The assembly elects the executive board that acts as the collective executive for the regional government, headed by the province's marshal. The current Executive Board of Lesser Poland is held by the Law and Justice party, headed by Marshal Witold Kozlowski.

The assembly convenes within the Marshal's Office in Kraków.

Districts 

Members of the Lesser Poland Regional Assembly are elected from six districts, serving five-year terms. Districts does not have the constituencies' formal names. Instead, each constituency has a number and territorial description.

See also 
 Polish Regional Assembly
 Lesser Poland Voivodeship

Charts

References

External links 
 
 

Lesser Poland
Assembly
Unicameral legislatures